The 2009–10 Adelaide United FC season was the club's fifth A-League season. It includes the A-League 2009–10 season as well as any other competitions of the 2009–10 football (soccer) season.

After a stellar season in the A-League and internationally, Adelaide United began its pre-season without a financial owner; Nick Bianco relinquished his A-League licence back to Football Federation Australia (FFA). Regardless of this situation, the FFA ensured that Adelaide would have the funds available to recruit in the off-season and to maintain the club, whilst they would negotiate the new ownership deals. Adelaide United managed to secure major sponsors Modern Solar as well as Jim's Plumbing for their 2009–10 season.

At the end of the 2008–09 regular season Adelaide United released veteran Angelo Costanzo as well as Jonas Salley, Isyan Erdogan and Jason Spagnuolo, with Diego Walsh moving to New Zealand club Wellington Phoenix
 and Saša Ognenovski moving to K-League side Seongnam Ilhwa. Veteran Adelaide players Michael Valkanis, Daniel Beltrame and Paul Agostino retired at the end of the 2008–09 season.

Adelaide made a number of signings to replace the players which left in the off-season, most notably former Sydney FC defenders, Iain Fyfe and Mark Rudan, Korean youngster Inseob Shin and former Drogheda United midfielder Adam Hughes. Arguably the biggest off-season signing was former Cheltenham Town and Brentford striker, Lloyd Owusu, a capped Ghanaian international. The Reds also elevated a handful of players from their Youth squad to the senior team, namely Francesco Monterosso, Michael Marrone and Joe Costa.

After making a rather average start to the 2009–10 season, the Reds made their final signing in promising young Bulleen Lions winger, Mathew Leckie prior to the Round 5 clash against Wellington Phoenix. Leckie made an immediate impression, and scored his first goal in his second game off the bench against North Queensland Fury and would soon become a fan favourite.

With two rounds to go, and Adelaide sitting at the base of the table, the Reds made a surprise announcement that Argentine playmaker, Marcos Flores, who had signed on for 2 years starting with the club's third AFC Champions League venture, was to make his debut as an injury replacement for fellow import Cristiano. The South American made his presence felt in the final two games of the regular season, and helped Adelaide United finish the season with two consecutive wins. This however, was still not enough to lift the club up from its 2009–10 wooden spoon status – the club's worst performing season in its short history.

Adelaide competed in the Champions League in 2010 after finishing second on the 2008–09 A-League league table, and runner-up in the Finals series to cross-border rivals, Melbourne Victory. This will mark the return of Adelaide United to the continental club champions' tournament after a 1-year absence.

On 7 December 2009, Adelaide were drawn into Group H of the Champions League alongside 2009 Asian Champions Pohang Steelers, Chinese sister club Shandong Luneng and the winners of the 2009 Japanese Emperor's Cup. Because Gamba Osaka, the winner of the Emperor's Cup, had already qualified through league placing, 4th placed Sanfrecce Hiroshima became Adelaide United's final opponent in Group H of the Champions League.

In Adelaide's first match of the campaign played on 24 February against Pohang Steelers, Adelaide secured an important victory at Hindmarsh Stadium winning 1–0 courtesy of a fantastic individual effort by youngster Mathew Leckie on the stroke of half-time. They then continued their winning form by beating Shandong Luneng 2–0 and then coming from a 1–2 deficit to beat Sanfrecce Hiroshima 3–2. Despite not quite playing to the standard set in their opening three matches, Adelaide United managed to hold on to top spot in the group by securing a 0–0 draw against Pohang in Korea in between narrow 1–0 losses to Hiroshima in Hiroshima and then to Shandong Luneng at Hindmarsh in Adelaide.

Other results fell Adelaide's way and they finished on top of Group H resulting in a home match in the Round of 16. In an exciting, nerve-racking match, Adelaide lost to Jeonbuk Motors 3–2. Adelaide came back twice in the game, including a goal in the final seconds of the match. Jeonbuk won the match with a goal in the second half of extra time.

Players

Squad information

First Team Roster

 Injury replacement player for Cristiano.

Youth Team Roster

2009–10 Transfers

First Team

In

Out

Youth Team

In

Out

Technical Staff

Statistics

Squad statistics

Goal scorers

Attendance at home games

Competitions

Pre-season

A-League

League table

Matches

AFC Champions League

Group stage

Round of 16

References

External links
 Official website

2009-10
2009–10 A-League season by team